Klipper is a clipboard manager for the KDE interface. It allows users of Unix-like operating systems running the KDE desktop environment to access a history of X Selections, any item of which can be reselected for pasting. It can also be used to perform an action automatically if certain text is selected (e.g. opening a URL in a browser).

References

External links
The Klipper Handbook

Clipboard (computing)
KDE software
KDE Software Compilation